Mebyon Kernow – The Party for Cornwall is a Cornish nationalist, centre-left political party in Cornwall, United Kingdom. It primarily campaigns for devolution to Cornwall in the form of a Cornish Assembly. It has representatives in local government (see main article), but has never succeeded in national elections.

Elections to Cornwall County Council

Elections to Cornwall Council

Elections to the House of Commons

Elections to the European Parliament

References

Election results by party in the United Kingdom